The European Association of Aerospace Students (EUROAVIA) is a European-based students' initiative, whose main fields of activity are aerospace, engineering and adjacent fields. EUROAVIA was founded in 1959 and is governed by Dutch law. 
This association represents the interests of over 2000 students from 42 Local Groups (Affiliated Societies) in 18 countries from all over Europe, counting over 2000 members in total.

EUROAVIA works to develop current and future leaders promoting the EUROAVIAn Spirit, a set of common values based upon hard work, innovation, cultural awareness, teamwork, and international networking.

Being both a non-political and non-profit association, EUROAVIA is managed exclusively by voluntary students with its various activities and projects entirely financed by membership fees, sponsorship, and participation fees.

The main goal of all the activities that are organized from EUROAVIA is the strengthening of the connection between the students and the aerospace industry and also to stimulate its members to become aware and familiarize themselves with the traditions and the culture of the countries that compose the association. EUROAVIA also aims to internationally represent European aerospace students and promote European cooperation in the aerospace field by providing opportunities for its members to meet, exchange and learn at all levels.

History 
In 1956, a group of students in Aachen, Germany, was inspired by the idea of founding an association that could gather all the European Aerospace students together. In 1958, they came together with students from Delft, Paris, and Pisa and decided to make a call for other students for a general meeting. 
In this meeting, there were 30 students from 10 universities in 4 different countries. The official statutes were presented and accepted on 16 March 1959. EUROAVIA began its work officially on 1 May 1959.

1960 marked the first business year of the association, under the guidance of the first International Board represented by the Local Group of Aachen. The first president, Jean Roeder saw his dream brought to life with the birth of EUROAVIA. The first year brought together students from several countries in Europe and managed to bridge a gap with the industry.

In 2013, EUROAVIA geographically expanded its borders outside Europe when Adjunct Member Kourou joined the association. Furthermore, in September 2016, the association welcomed a new Prospective Adjunct Member from Egypt, Zewail City, connecting Aerospace engineering students from all over the world.

Structure 
EUROAVIA today is composed of three fundamental pylons: the International Board, the Affiliated Societies and the Working Groups.

The International Board 

The International Board (IB) is the board of directors of EUROAVIA, elected every year during a congress. They represent the association at the international level and are responsible for the general functioning of the association. The IB is formed by at least 3 members: President, Secretary, Treasurer and Executive Members. The powers, duties and responsibilities of the International Board are defined in the EUROAVIA Statutes and Bylaws.

Affiliated Societies 
EUROAVIA is an international student association with multiple Local Groups across Europe that spread and live the EUROAVIA spirit, a set of common values based upon hard work, innovation, cultural awareness, teamwork and international networking. Today, EUROAVIA counts 39 local groups, in 18 countries for a total of more than 2000 members.

Working Groups 
Working Groups are formed by volunteering members from local groups and are responsible for accomplishing and maintaining international projects for benefit of all EUROAVIA members.
There are 9 Working Groups: Affiliated Societies, Communication, Business Relations, Design, Human Resources, Information Technology, International Events, Statues & Bylaws, EUROAVIA Training System. The role of each one is described as follows:

- Affiliated Societies:

The Affiliated Societies Working Group was established during EMEAC 2011 in Lisbon in order to increase the efficiency of communication between Affiliated Societies and the International Board. After EMEAC 2015 in Sevilla, a restructuring of this WG was required and this WG got divided into three different departments:  the Board of Presidents Unit (BoP), the Search & Rescue Unit (SaR) and the EUROAVIA Expansion Unit (EAX). 

- Communication:

This Working Group is responsible for: designing the communication strategy along with the IB, promoting the social media of EUROAVIA, updating the News Section on the EUROAVIA website, write the EUROAVIA Newsletter and Magazine. This WG is divided into three units: Social Media Unit, Website & Blog Unit and Press Unit.

- Business Relations:

The task of the Business Relations Working Group is to help the International Board in establishing and maintaining communication with third parties, to manage the Marketing Strategy of EUROAVIA International and to communicate with the other WGs in order to develop all material needed and online platforms. The Business Relations Working Group is also responsible for handling the relations with the collaborating Affiliated Societies and supporting the local level of EUROAVIA by transferring their knowledge and by working along with them to increase the number of partners, at the local and international level. Business Relations Working Group is divided into units and subunits to ensure a good detachment of tasks and responsibilities among its members.

- Design:

The Design WG has the responsibility to manage the corporate identity, design brochures, design promotional material & commercials, manage the design of the website, design merchandise, develop the EUROAVIA webshop project and adapt the ticketing system developed by the IT WG for better management of the requests.

- Human Resources:

As EUROAVIA gets bigger, the management of its workforce becomes more and more challenging. Firstly, the Working Groups are in constant need of new members for satisfying their workload demands. Consequently, the need to train these freshmen might take lots of resources from the correspondent WG.
Furthermore, members can find great benefits as they are the main asset in which companies are interested. Providing these partners with profiles and CVs will bring relevant opportunities for both sides. After looking at the big picture we came to the conclusion that the creation of a new working group that could give an effective solution to these problems was necessary: the Human Resources Working Group.

- Information Technology: 

The Information Technology Working Group (ITWG) is a team of enthusiastic EUROAVIAns responsible for all the technological and communication tools of the association. They are responsible for maintaining and improving the website, the e-mailing system for all the members, working groups and the International Board, the Central Archive and all the cloud-based documents sharing systems, the official templates of EUROAVIA, and so on. Moreover, the IT WG is responsible for supporting the Local Groups with any IT request such as improving their website, providing them personalized e-mail addresses or a Sharepoint team site. All the activities of the IT WG can be included under two main groups: the website and Microsoft Office 365.
The website is the central point for all EUROAVIA members and for any person who might be interested in knowing better what EUROAVIA is about. On this website, you will always be able to find the most updated information about our association and our activities, plus all the opportunities we offer to our members. Microsoft Office 365 is an online suite that includes Exchange (the mailing system), SharePoint (team website and cloud systems) and Lync (professional video-conferencing tool). Read more about Microsoft Office 365 and how you can benefit from it.

- International Events: 

The International Events WG works to ensure high-quality international events in EUROAVIA by supporting the Affiliated Societies involved in the organisation of such events. There are many types of international events, each focusing on developing specific aspects, and all of them are organised by one of our Affiliated Societies. International events are the true core of EUROAVIA, the moment when the EUROAVIA spirit gets instilled in every participant and, for those few days, the dream of our founding fathers becomes extremely clear. This is why the International Events WG is one of the most active and most important in EUROAVIA! Organising an international event is not an easy task. It requires time, energy and commitment, not to mention a strong and cohesive team willing to work together for several months. EUROAVIA international events, then, must respect some minimum quality standards reported in article 3.5 of the EUROAVIA Bylaws. It is for all these reasons that the International Events WG was founded during EMEAC 2011 Lisboa, to support (prospective) Affiliated Societies in the fulfilment of these projects. During the years, the International Events WG has also acquired additional tasks and responsibility, bringing it to have three main areas of responsibility.

- Statutes & Bylaws:

The task of the Statutes and Bylaws Working Group is to make sure that the official Statutes and Bylaws of EUROAVIA are up to date and adequately meet the contemporary needs of the association, to help finance EUROAVIA activities and structural costs through active use of the European Commission funding platform, and to keep up to date on opportunities and due procedure for European Funds by coordinating the preparation of proposals for amending EUROAVIA Statutes and Bylaws and distributing them to all (Prospective) Affiliated Societies/ (Prospective) Adjunct Members in due time before a Congress, renewing the agreements between EUROAVIA and foundations linked to EUROAVIA while observing compliance with EUROAVIA interests, assisting the International Board in negotiating with new partners for collaborations, sharing, with the International Board, the task of preparing and reviewing the necessary documents before the final agreement with the prospective partner, ensuring new agreements are complying with EUROAVIA interests, actively communicating with collaborating/partner entities in the gathering of European Grants information, increasing EUROAVIA’s understanding of European Grants mechanisms, opportunities and due procedures and submitting applications for structural costs financing through European Grants.

- EUROAVIA Training System:

EUROAVIA Training Systems main goal is to deliver soft skills formation to EUROAVIA members. Doing so, enables all members to develop themselves. The responsibilities of this WG are: scheduling the new training, tracking the training delivered, managing the trainers travel support requests, planning the future Formation Workshops/Train-New-Trainers events and planning the future of the EUROAVIA Training System.

International Events 
The International Events of EUROAVIA are generally organized by a Local Group in coordination with the other organs of the association. All members are invited.

Air Cargo Challenge (ACC) 
The Air Cargo Challenge is an aeronautical engineering competition that is held every two years. The main objective is to design and build a radio-controlled aircraft that is able to fly with the highest possible payload according to the rules established in the competition regulations. This event allows participants to improve both their technical and soft skills.

Congresses 
The Congresses are EUROAVIA's legislative body. Their aim is to present the plans for the next business year, to set goals as well as elect the future representatives. Two mandatory meetings are held every year: the EMEAC (Electoral Meeting of the EUROAVIA Congress) and the AMEAC (Annual Meeting of the EUROAVIA Congress). Any other supplementary meeting is called ExMEAC (Extra Meeting of the EUROAVIA Congress).

Fly-In 
Fly-in are non-technical events during which the hosting Affiliated Society shows and promotes the aerospace culture of its area. People from different local groups get together and take part in several activities, sharing their culture and spirit.

Symposia  
Symposia are technical events that, through lectures, workshops, visits to laboratories and companies, aim at developing one specific topic. Participants are given the unique chance to improve their knowledge and expertise of the topic the symposium focuses on.

Train New Trainers (TNT)  
Train New Trainers is a genuine EUROAVIA project which aims to implement the Internal Training System of EUROAVIA. It is the product of the Innovation and Development WG and the IE WG will support the organization of the event.

Formation Workshop (FoWo)  
Formation Workshop is EUROAVIA's internal training event with the main goal to increase the quality of EUROAVIAn operations. The Formation Workshop shall take place in the first half of every business year and is exclusively for EUROAVIA members.

Rocket Workshop (RoWo) 
Rocket Workshop is an international event that focuses on enhancing the technical abilities of the participants, whilst stimulating teamwork. Contestants learn to communicate efficiently, to deal with a time limit, with the ultimate goal of designing and building a rocket.

Airbus Sloshing Rocket Worskshop 
The Airbus Sloshing Rocket Workshop is a competition in which teams are tasked to design, build and fly a low-cost reusable rocket that is destabilized by the movement of water stored within an unpressurized tank. The design shall incorporate passive and/or active control mechanisms and its performance is a key aspect of the design in order to maximize range, time of flight, and liquid payload capacity.

Sponsors 
	Airbus
      BDLI
       Lilium GmbH
       EDU opinions
       IT Aerea
       Wrike
       Valispace

Partners 

  International Space University
 International STEM Awards
 Council of European Aerospace Societies
 Think Young
 Global Management Challenge
 PEGASUS
 Junior Enterprises Europe
 European Institute for Industrial Leadership
 SIMSCALE
 CVA
 IFISO
 iSpace School

References

External links 
http://euroavia.eu/

Aerospace engineering organizations
Engineering education
European student organizations
International aviation organizations
Organizations established in 1959